Thomas Hedberg was a British sailor and Olympic Champion. He competed at the 1920 Summer Olympics in Antwerp and won a gold medal in the 18 ft. Dinghy class with Francis Richards.

References

External links
 

Year of death missing
British male sailors (sport)
Sailors at the 1920 Summer Olympics – 18' Dinghy
Olympic sailors of Great Britain
Olympic gold medallists for Great Britain
Year of birth missing
Olympic medalists in sailing
Medalists at the 1920 Summer Olympics
20th-century British people